General Bond may refer to:

Charles Bond (pilot) (1915–2009), U.S. Air Force major general
Henry Bond (British Army officer) (1873–1919), British Army brigadier general
Lionel Bond (1884–1961), British Army lieutenant general
Robert M. Bond (1929–1984), U.S. Air Force lieutenant general
William R. Bond (1918–1970), U.S. Army brigadier general

See also
Thord Bonde (1900–1969), Swedish Army general
General obligation bond, a common type of municipal bond in the United States